Ioby (stylized as ioby, an acronym for "in our backyards") is a US-based civic crowdfunding platform operated by a non-profit 501(c)3 organization; it was incorporated in 2007 and launched in beta in April 2009.

References

External links
 Official website

Crowdfunding platforms of the United States
Environmental organizations based in the United States